A telematic control unit (TCU) in the automobile industry refers to the embedded system on board of a vehicle that wirelessly connects the vehicle to cloud services or other vehicles via V2X standards over a Cellular network. The TCU collects telemetry data from the vehicle, such as position, speed, engine data, connectivity quality etc through interfacing with various sub-systems over data and control busses in the vehicle. It may also provide in-vehicle connectivity via Wifi and Bluetooth and implements the eCall function on applicable markets.

Note that in the automotive domain, the TCU acronym is also often used to refer to the transmission control unit. Disambiguation is usually possible from looking at the context.

A TCU consists of:
 a Satellite navigation (GNSS) unit, which keeps track of the latitude and longitude values of the vehicle;
 an external interface for mobile communication (GSM, GPRS, Wi-Fi, WiMax, LTE or 5G), which provides the tracked values to a centralized geographical information system (GIS) database server;
 an electronic processing unit;
a microcontroller, in some versions; a microprocessor or field programmable gate array (FPGA), which processes the information and acts on the interface between the GPS;
 a mobile communication unit;
 and some amount of memory for saving GPS values in case of mobile-free zones or to intelligently store information about the vehicle's sensor data.

See also
Telematics

Auto parts
Embedded systems